SteamWorld Tower Defense is a tower defense video game by Swedish video game developer Image & Form. It was released digitally on Nintendo DSi in North America, Europe and Australia on July 5, 2010. It is the first game released in the SteamWorld series.

Gameplay 
In SteamWorld Tower Defense the player controls an army of steam-powered robots in a tower defense-style gameplay. The aim of the game is to take down wandering troops of human invaders in their attempt to steal gold from the robots' mining facilities. To clear a mission, the player must take down waves of human soldiers by building and strategically placing out attack robots with a range of abilities and weapons. It's possible to play the game on several difficulty levels.

Reception 

SteamWorld Tower Defense on Nintendo DSi has received "mixed or average" reviews from critics, with a current score of 71/100 on Metacritic.

Lucas M Thomas of IGN gave the game an eight out of ten, praising how polished the game's presentation was for a DSi title. Andrew Wight of Nintendo Life noted that the game's fun was accompanied by "frustratingly difficult" segments that hindered its overall quality, praising it for being a fun title nevertheless.

Development 
On their YouTube channel, Image & Form revealed that SteamWorld Tower Defense is the hardest game the studio has created. Apparently, the game's lead developer is the only of Image & Form employees to finish the game.

The game is set before the events depicted in SteamWorld Dig and SteamWorld Heist.

References

External links 
 Official SteamWorld Tower Defense website 
 Developer's website

2010 video games
Indie video games
Nintendo DS games
DSiWare games
Nintendo DS-only games
Single-player video games
Steampunk video games
Video games developed in Sweden
Video games set on fictional planets
SteamWorld